Gemerská Poloma is a village and large municipality in the Rožňava District in the Košice Region of middle-eastern Slovakia.

History
The area of Gemerská Poloma was variously part of Great Moravia and the medieval Kingdom of Hungary.  In 1241 the area was subject to Mongol invasion.

The first historical mention of the village was in 1282; as "Poloma". At the end of the 14th century, Poloma was divided into two distinct villages: Malá Poloma ("Small Poloma") and Veľká Poloma ("Big Poloma").  The two villages were ultimately united together again in 1958.

The original name of the village comes from polom, meaning "broken" in Slovak.  The story says that there was a big storm one day nearby the current village in the mountains and ruined the dwellings of the inhabitants.  They therefore chose to move away from the place and settle down closer to the river on the current village site.

Gemerská Poloma was invaded by the Ottoman Turks in 1557 and belonged to the Bebek family of Štítnik until the end of the 16th century.

Several people died from the cholera epidemic in the period 1873–1875.

Geography
The village lies at an altitude of 342 metres and covers an area of 57.635 km².
It has a population of about 2020 people. The river Slana passes on the southern part of the village. There are three important mountains surrounding the village: Turecka on the south, Volovec on the south-west and Sulova on the north.

Culture
The village has a public library a swimming pool (non-functional) and a football pitch.

The most important people born in Gemerska Poloma are Peter Kellner-Hostinský and Peter Madáč. Peter Kellner-Hostinský (1823-1873) was an important writer, philosopher, historitian, economist. Peter Madac was a famous doctor of medicine and a specialist in physics.

Location

Genealogical resources

The records for genealogical research are available at the state archive "Statny Archiv in Kosice, Slovakia"

 Roman Catholic church records (births/marriages/deaths): 1777-1897 (parish A)
 Lutheran church records (births/marriages/deaths): 1784-1865 (parish A)

See also 
Poloma, a town in Prešov Region
 List of municipalities and towns in Slovakia

References

External links
https://web.archive.org/web/20080111223415/http://www.statistics.sk/mosmis/eng/run.html 
http://www.gemerskapoloma.sk/
http://www.gemerskapoloma.ou.sk/
Surnames of living people in Gemerska Poloma

Villages and municipalities in Rožňava District